Bucynthia is a genus of longhorn beetles of the subfamily Lamiinae, containing the following species:

 Bucynthia borchmanni (Breuning, 1959)
 Bucynthia marmorata (Breuning, 1963)
 Bucynthia spiloptera (Pascoe, 1863)

Possibly also: 
 Bucynthia ochrescens Breuning, 1980

References

Desmiphorini